Ross John Greer (born 1 June 1994) is a Scottish politician who has been a Member of the Scottish Parliament (MSP) for the West Scotland region since 2016. A member of the Scottish Greens, he was the youngest MSP elected in the 2016 election.

Early life and career
Greer was educated at Bearsden Academy, leaving in 2012. Greer was a member of the Scottish Youth Parliament, representing the Clydebank and Milngavie constituency 2011–13. Greer joined the Scottish Greens at the age of 15.  He took part in the Debating Matters competition in 2012, where he reached the national final.

Greer began a course of study at the University of Strathclyde, in psychology and politics, but left without graduating in December 2012 to work for pro-independence campaign Yes Scotland as their youth and student co-ordinator and became their communities co-ordinator during the 2014 Scottish independence referendum. After the referendum, he was employed by the Scottish Greens in a role that involved strategy development.

Political career
Greer stood as the Scottish Green candidate in the East Dunbartonshire constituency in the 2015 general election, securing 5th place with 804 votes (1.5%). He became the Scottish Greens' party spokesman on Europe and external affairs. In March 2015, the Scottish Greens announced Greer had been selected as the lead candidate for their West Scotland regional list, following a ballot of their members.

Ahead of the 2016 Scottish Parliament election, Greer was critical that the general level of engagement with 16 and 17-year-olds as first-time voters had been below what was seen in the referendum. On 6 May 2016, he was elected with 17,218 votes (5.3%) as an additional member for the West Scotland region. Elected at the age of 21 years old, he became  Scotland's youngest MSP. Before Greer was elected, the youngest MSP had previously been Labour's Mark Griffin, who was 25 years old when he was first elected in 2011. On 22 May, he was appointed the Scottish Greens' spokesperson for International Development and External Affairs, Education and Skills, and Culture and Media.

Like his Green colleagues, Greer is opposed to an independent Scotland joining NATO. He told the Daily Record:
NATO is a 'first strike' nuclear alliance, meaning it claims the right to launch its weapons of mass slaughter against other countries without having been attacked first. There can never, ever be justification for murdering millions of innocent people like that. For this reason alone, never mind NATO's history of provoking rather than avoiding conflict, the Scottish Greens are clear that an independent Scotland should follow Ireland's lead and stay out. Instead, we should immediately sign the Treaty on the Prohibition of Nuclear Weapons, which would not only make the Trident submarines at Faslane illegal and force their removal, it would also show that we refuse to let others use weapons of mass destruction on our behalf.

Greer currently serves as the co-chair of the Scottish Greens Executive Committee.

Controversy

In 2019, Greer was strongly criticised for posting a tweet in June 2012 saying "I'm not exaggerating when I say nothing would thrill me more than for Buckingham Palace to burn to the ground." Later the same year, Greer was criticised for tweeting about organising a party to celebrate the death of Margaret Thatcher (who was critically ill at the time) which contained the words "hope she goes soon!"

On 25 January 2019, Greer posted a tweet calling Winston Churchill "a white supremacist mass murderer." He later went on Good Morning Britain and Politics Live and was challenged on his views. This was not the first time Greer has been criticised for his comments about the Second World War; a few years prior he was accused of historical ignorance after tweeting that "Britain was happy to live with Hitler".

Personal life 
Greer is a member of the Church of Scotland.

References

External links

 
 profile on Scottish Greens website

1994 births
Place of birth missing (living people)
Living people
People educated at Bearsden Academy
Members of the Scottish Parliament 2016–2021
Scottish Green Party MSPs
People from Bearsden
Members of the Scottish Parliament 2021–2026